Long Ping may refer to:
 Long Ping Estate, a public housing estate in Yuen Long, Hong Kong
 Long Ping station, an MTR rapid transit station adjacent to the estate